The National Institute of Technology (abbreviated as ITENAS), is a private, technology-oriented university located in Bandung, Indonesia.

ITENAS was established in 1972 as the National Academy of Technology (abbreviated as ATENAS) by the Dayang Sumbi Educational Foundation with R. Mansoer Wiratmadja as its first rector. ATENAS originally had four faculties, which focused on Architecture, Civil Engineering, Electrical Engineering, and Mechanical Engineering, respectively.

ATENAS was renamed the National Institute of Technology (NIT) in 1984, which currently has three faculties, namely the faculties of industrial technology, civil engineering, planning, and art and design.

References

External links
 

Universities in Bandung
Educational institutions established in 1972
1972 establishments in Indonesia
Private universities and colleges in Indonesia